Erdal Barkay (14 March 1928 – 3 October 2005) was a Turkish hurdler and sprinter. He competed in the men's 110 metres hurdles at the Summer Olympics in 1948 and 1952, and in the men's 4 × 100 metres relay at the 1948 Summer Olympics.

References

External links
 

1928 births
2005 deaths
Turkish male sprinters
Turkish male hurdlers
Olympic athletes of Turkey
Athletes (track and field) at the 1948 Summer Olympics
Athletes (track and field) at the 1952 Summer Olympics
Place of birth missing
20th-century Turkish people